Anna Kalinskaya and Tereza Mihalíková were the defending champions, but Kalinskaya chose to participate in Saint-Gaudens instead. Mihalíková partnered Chantal Škamlová, but they lost in the first round to Chuang Chia-jung and Renata Voráčová.

Naomi Broady and Heather Watson won the title, defeating Chuang and Voráčová in the final, 6–3, 6–2.

Seeds

Draw

References
Main Draw

Empire Slovak Open - Doubles